In six-dimensional geometry, a rectified 6-simplex is a convex uniform 6-polytope, being a rectification of the regular 6-simplex.

There are three unique degrees of rectifications, including the zeroth, the 6-simplex itself. Vertices of the rectified 6-simplex are located at the edge-centers of the 6-simplex. Vertices of the birectified 6-simplex are located in the triangular face centers of the 6-simplex.

Rectified 6-simplex

Alternate names 
 Rectified heptapeton (Acronym: ril) (Jonathan Bowers)

Coordinates 
The vertices of the rectified 6-simplex can be most simply positioned in 7-space as permutations of (0,0,0,0,0,1,1). This construction is based on facets of the rectified 7-orthoplex.

Images

Birectified 6-simplex

Alternate names 
 Birectified heptapeton (Acronym: bril) (Jonathan Bowers)

Coordinates 
The vertices of the birectified 6-simplex can be most simply positioned in 7-space as permutations of (0,0,0,0,1,1,1). This construction is based on facets of the birectified 7-orthoplex.

Images

Related uniform 6-polytopes 

The rectified 6-simplex polytope is the vertex figure of the 7-demicube, and the edge figure of the uniform 241 polytope.

These polytopes are a part of 35 uniform 6-polytopes based on the [3,3,3,3,3] Coxeter group, all shown here in A6 Coxeter plane orthographic projections.

Notes

References 
 H.S.M. Coxeter: 
 H.S.M. Coxeter, Regular Polytopes, 3rd Edition, Dover New York, 1973 
 Kaleidoscopes: Selected Writings of H.S.M. Coxeter, edited by F. Arthur Sherk, Peter McMullen, Anthony C. Thompson, Asia Ivic Weiss, Wiley-Interscience Publication, 1995,  
 (Paper 22) H.S.M. Coxeter, Regular and Semi Regular Polytopes I, [Math. Zeit. 46 (1940) 380–407, MR 2,10]
 (Paper 23) H.S.M. Coxeter, Regular and Semi-Regular Polytopes II, [Math. Zeit. 188 (1985) 559-591]
 (Paper 24) H.S.M. Coxeter, Regular and Semi-Regular Polytopes III, [Math. Zeit. 200 (1988) 3-45]
 Norman Johnson Uniform Polytopes, Manuscript (1991)
 N.W. Johnson: The Theory of Uniform Polytopes and Honeycombs, Ph.D. 
 o3x3o3o3o3o - ril, o3x3o3o3o3o - bril

External links 
 Polytopes of Various Dimensions
 Multi-dimensional Glossary

6-polytopes